The Üçayaklı ruins are a Byzantine-era archaeological site in Mersin Province, Turkey.

Geography 

The ruins 

The ruins are composed of two houses and a cistern. The big house is a two or three-storey building with balconies and wide windows on the second floor. The building was a villa rustica during the Byzantine Empire period. The stone walls, interior coving and blind vaults as well as corbels to support the balconies survive. But the ceiling and floor structures which were wooden have been demolished. There is a wide downspout which leads the rain water to a cistern at the back of the house. (In the Mediterranean area such cisterns were common during the Roman times). One of the balconies was a toilet room with sewage drain.  There is also a smaller house at the back which was probably a service building of the villa.

References

Former populated places in Turkey
Ruins in Turkey
Villa rustica
Archaeological sites in Mersin Province, Turkey